Pine Mountain is a rhyolitic mountain east of Bend and south of U.S. Route 20 (US 20) in eastern Deschutes County, Oregon, United States. It is the site of an astronomical observatory called the Pine Mountain Observatory. The mountain is a part of the Deschutes Formation (which is related to Cascade volcanism) and is the southeasternmost exposure of the formation and is of similar age to Cline Buttes.

Geology 
Pine Mountain shows considerable erosion and is covered with thick soil deposits. The mountain consists of basalt, rhyolite, andesite and dacite. Dunes mark the northwest flank of the mountain, consisting of pumiceous dust and lapilli.

History 
On September 17, 1984 a large fireball was seen from the Pine Mountain Observatory heading northeasterly before breaking into six orange fragments.

References 

Mountains of Oregon
Landforms of Deschutes County, Oregon
Volcanoes of Oregon